Miguel Benincasa (born 30 November 1888, date of death unknown) was a Uruguayan footballer. He played in three matches for the Uruguay national football team from 1914 to 1916. He was also part of Uruguay's squad for the 1916 South American Championship.

References

External links
 

1888 births
Year of death missing
Uruguayan footballers
Uruguay international footballers
Place of birth missing
Association football defenders